The Men's skeet event at the 2016 Olympic Games took place on 12 and 13 August 2016 at the National Shooting Center.

Records
Prior to this competition, the existing world and Olympic records were as follows.

Results

Qualification round

Semifinal

Final (medal matches)

References

Shooting at the 2016 Summer Olympics
Men's events at the 2016 Summer Olympics